Jurij Bradač (born June 29, 1973 in Maribor), better known by his stage name Yuri Bradac, is a Slovenian actor and model.

Career
His career began in television in the 2005 and has continued both in television and film since, including comedic, dramatic, and action roles. He is known for the role of Grigori in the Broken Angel and as Ivanoff in film Futbaal: The Price of Dreams. He has been working with such names as Lady Gaga, Enrique Iglesias, Jennifer Lopez, Timbaland and Lili Rocha, appearing in their respective music videos such as Bad Romance (Lady Gaga), Morning After Dark (Timbaland), On The Floor (Jennifer Lopez/Pitbull) and No Me Digas Que No (Enrique Iglesias).

Actor

Filmography

Music videos

References

External links 

 yuribradac.com (Official)
 

Living people
1973 births
Slovenian male models
Slovenian male film actors
Slovenian male television actors
Actors from Maribor
21st-century Slovenian male actors
Models from Maribor